The Royal Oak is a pub in Mount Road, Bexleyheath, Kent.

It is a Grade II listed building, built in the early 19th century.

See also
Pub names#Royal Oak

References

External links
 

Grade II listed pubs in London
Grade II listed buildings in the London Borough of Bexley
Bexleyheath
Pubs in the London Borough of Bexley